David John Thomas Moffatt (18 May 1892 – 8 November 1950) was an Australian rules footballer who played in the VFL between 1912 and 1917 and finally in 1919 and 1920 for the Richmond Football Club.

Notes

References
 Hogan P: The Tigers Of Old, Richmond FC, Melbourne 1996

External links
 
 

Players of Australian handball
1892 births
1950 deaths
Australian rules footballers from Melbourne
Australian Rules footballers: place kick exponents
Richmond Football Club players
Richmond Football Club Premiership players
One-time VFL/AFL Premiership players
People from South Melbourne